The Drwęca is a river in northern Poland and a tributary of the Vistula river near Toruń, forming a part of the city's administrative boundary. It has a length of 231 km and a basin area of 5,697 km2, all in Poland.

Towns:
Nowe Miasto Lubawskie
Brodnica
Golub-Dobrzyń
Toruń

References

Rivers of Poland
Rivers of Warmian-Masurian Voivodeship
Rivers of Kuyavian-Pomeranian Voivodeship